The 1st Colonial Infantry Division was a French Army formation prior to World War I and during World War II.

Before World War I  

Prior to the start of World War I, the division was composed of:
5th Colonial Infantry Regiment
6th Colonial Infantry Regiment
21st Colonial Infantry Regiment
23rd Colonial Infantry Regiment

However, in the re-organisation immediately prior to World War I, the division was disbanded, with the 5th and 6th Colonial Infantry Regiments going to the French 14th Corps, and the 21st and 23rd Colonial Infantry Regiments going to the French 1st Colonial Corps.

1927 - 1940  
On 1 November 1927, the 1st Senegalese Colonial Infantry Division was recreated by transformation of the 35th infantry division. 
It was stationed in Bordeaux, and later renamed 1st Colonial Infantry Division.

It was an active division which existed during peacetime. The Senegalese Tirailleurs Regiments contained  troops from French West Africa.  The Colonial Infantry and Artillery Regiments were made up of French troops who had volunteered to serve overseas if needed.

During the Battle of France in May 1940 the division was made up of the following units:
3rd Colonial Infantry Regiment
12th Senegalese Tirailleurs Regiment
14th Senegalese Tirailleurs Regiment
71st Reconnaissance Battalion
1st Colonial Divisionary Artillery Regiment
201st Colonial Artillery Regiment

The Division was disbanded after the capitulation of the French Army in June 1940.

References 

Colonial Infantry Division, 1st
Infantry divisions of France
French West Africa